Emilio Alberto Aragón Bermúdez (4 November 1929 – 18 November 2012), better known as Miliki, was a Spanish clown, accordionist and singer, he was a member of the artist family Aragón. He was declared Son of the City of Carmona and received the Silver Medal of that town.

He was born in Carmona (Seville), Spain, the son of the clown Emilio Aragón Foureaux, known as Emig, and nephew of Pompoff and Thedy. At a very early age he joined his brothers Gabriel (Gaby) and Alfonso (Fofó) to form the trio Gaby, Fofó and Miliki. They began working during the 1930s and held several seasons at the Circo Price in Madrid.

His mother was the horseback acrobat dancer Rocío Bermúdez (born in Carmona) and also had a younger sister, Rocío, a flamenco dancer. He was the father of the famous actor, comedian, musician, filmmaker, composer, clown and entrepreneur audiovisual Emilio Aragón Álvarez, also known as Milikito.

Los payasos de la tele
After a stay in Cuba, Venezuela, Puerto Rico and Argentina, he returned to Spain in 1972 and the following year began work on the TV program El gran circo de TVE, which made the group (which became known as Los payasos de la tele, the TV clowns) a completely sociological phenomenon in Spain. Following the withdrawal of the program in 1983, he left the group and launched a new phase in his career.

Miliki and Rita Irasema
After the professional separation of the clowns, Miliki dedicated to the world of musical production (he launched the band Monano y su banda), and formed an artistic tandem with his daughter Rita Irasema. Together they recorded several albums such as La vuelta al mundo en 30 minutos (1986), El flautista de Hamelín (1987), Vamos a marcarnos una canción (1991) and ¡Superdiscoguay! (1992) or ¿Estás contento? ¡Sí señor! (1994). He also directed the film Yo quiero ser torero (1987)

With the advent of private television in Spain, he returned to television to host children's programs, with his daughter Rita. They hosted La merienda (1990-1991) and La guardería (1990-1991), both in Antena 3, and Superguay (1991-1993) in Telecinco. In 1993, they relaunched on TVE El gran circo de TVE, which lasted until 1995.

Writer
He wrote in 2008 the book La providencia under the pseudonym Emile A. Foureaux aimed at an adult audience, it tells the story of Martín, a guerrilla militant in the Cuban revolution, who has to escape a hunt orchestrated by Fidel Castro in New York.

Death

On November 18, 2012, Miliki died of pneumonia, aged 83, in Madrid. He was also reported to have suffered from Parkinson's disease for the last year of his life.

Discography

With Los Payasos de la Tele 

 Lo que tanto esperé (1950)
 Gaby, Fofó, Miliki y familia en el show de las 5 (1963)
 Pinocho (1965)
 A sus amiguitos 
 Adelantando éxitos
 Todos los niños del mundo son nuestros amiguitos
 Había una vez un circo
 Gaby, Fofó, Miliki con Fofito
 Los más grandes éxitos
 Susanita, Papá y Mamá, El Sombrero de Gaspar, etc
 La familia unida
 Había una vez un disco
 Como me pica la nariz
 Cantando, siempre cantando
 El loco mundo de los payasos
 La historia de los payasos

With Rita Irasema 

 La vuelta al mundo en 30 minutos (1986)
 El flautista de Hamelín (1987)
 Vamos a marcarnos una canción (1991)
 ¡Superdiscoguay! (1992)
 ¿Estás contento?, ¡sí señor! (1994)

Single

Studio albums

Álbumes Recopilatorios

External albums

Other 

No se puede vivir con un franco, BSO of the film Pájaros de papel.

Collaborations

Filmography

1948: El nieto del Zorro.
1955: Tres bárbaros en un jeep.
1972: Había una vez un circo.
1973: Los padrinos.
1982: Tompy, el conejito de trapo.
1999: Trilocos (TV series).
2002: Miliki presenta... Había una vez.
2002: La Cuba mía.
2003: El desván mágico de Miliki.
2005: 90 millas, as Pancho.
2008: Carlitos y el campo de los sueños, as Miliki.
2010: Pájaros de papel.

Books

1996: Recuerdos.
2001: La máquina de los coches.
2003: Juan Olores.
2008: La Providencia.
2009: Con alma de niño.
2012: Mientras duermen los murciélagos.

Notes

References

External links

1929 births
2012 deaths
Spanish clowns
People from Campiña de Carmona
Singers from Andalusia
20th-century Spanish musicians
20th-century Spanish male singers
20th-century Spanish singers
Spanish accordionists
People with Parkinson's disease
Deaths from pneumonia in Spain